"Devastated" is the third single from Australian singer Sam Clark's debut studio album, Take Me Home. The single is also Clark's debut single in the UK. It was released physically in Australia on 30 July 2010 and digitally on 1 August.

Music video
Released on 3 August, the video for the song was directed by Joel Kohn. The video shows Clark playing the part of four members of a news team – a serious anchor, a campy reporter in the field, a sports reporter and a female weather presenter named Macey Downpour. The video was also one of the ten most viewed Australian videos on YouTube as of the week commencing 15 August 2010.

Charts
On 22 August 2010, "Devastated" debuted at number one on the Australian Physical Singles Chart. On 23 August, it debuted on the AIR Singles Chart (Australian independent chart) at number sixteen.

Track listing

Release history

References

Sam Clark songs
2010 singles
2010 songs
Songs written by Paul Wiltshire